Richard Joseph Tracewski (born February 3, 1935) is a retired American professional baseball player, coach and manager. During his active career, he was an infielder for the Los Angeles Dodgers and Detroit Tigers of Major League Baseball, appearing in 614 games over eight seasons (1962–69).

Tracewski was a four-time World Series champion as a player and coach. He participated in three Fall Classics as a player: two with Los Angeles (1963, 1965) and one with Detroit (1968). He was the starting second baseman in the Dodgers' four-game sweep of the Yankees in 1963, and also started four games at second during the seven-game 1965 classic. He also served as first-base coach for the Tigers in the 1984 World Series.

Tracewski's playing career began in the Brooklyn Dodgers' organization in 1953 and it took him almost a decade to reach the majors. He was the Dodgers' second baseman on the evening of September 9, 1965, when Sandy Koufax tossed a perfect game against the Chicago Cubs. He was traded to the Tigers for Phil Regan on December 15, 1965, and spent the rest of his career in the Detroit organization.

During his eight-season MLB playing tenure, he batted .213, with eight home runs and 91 RBIs. His 262 hits (in 1,231 at bats) also included 31 doubles and nine triples. He went 4-for-30 (.133) in World Series play.

Tracewski then managed in the Detroit farm system for two seasons (1970–71).  In 1972, he began a 24-year stint as a coach for Detroit, longer than any other coach in Tiger history. Tracewski, on two occasions, filled in as the Tigers' interim manager.  He managed the club for two games in 1979 (the Tigers winning both) before Sparky Anderson arrived, and from May 20, 1989, to early July while Anderson recovered from exhaustion. 

Tracewski retired from baseball after the  season, as did his long-time boss, Anderson.

External links

, or Retrosheet, or SABR Biography Project

1935 births
Living people
American people of Polish descent
Asheville Tourists players
Atlanta Crackers players
Bakersfield Dodgers players
Baseball coaches from Pennsylvania
Baseball players from Pennsylvania
Cedar Rapids Raiders players
Detroit Tigers coaches
Detroit Tigers managers
Detroit Tigers players
Fort Worth Cats players
Hornell Dodgers players
Lakeland Flying Tigers managers
Los Angeles Dodgers players
Major League Baseball first base coaches
Major League Baseball infielders
Major League Baseball third base coaches
Omaha Dodgers players
People from Lackawanna County, Pennsylvania
Pueblo Dodgers players
Sheboygan Indians players
Spokane Indians players
Thomasville Dodgers players
American expatriate baseball players in Colombia
American expatriate baseball players in Panama